Philip Callan (1837 - 13 June 1902) was an Irish Member of Parliament.

Early life
Callan was born in Cookstown House Ardee in 1837 and was the son of Owen Callan MP. He studied law at Trinity College Dublin, and also at the King's Inns as can be seen in his papers for Kings Inns Admittance. He was called to the Bar in Dublin in 1865 and shortly after was also called to the English Bar.

Member of Parliament
Callan was elected to Parliament as a Liberal, for the Borough constituency of Dundalk, in 1868. Re-elected as a Home Ruler in the 1874 general election, he was elected also for County Louth. He chose to continue sitting for the Dundalk seat. In 1880, however, he ran for the Louth constituency instead and was elected, remaining as MP until the 1885 general election. He tried, unsuccessfully, to be re-elected in 1892 and 1896.

Callan died, from heart disease, at his residence in Dublin on 13 June 1902.

Walter Ernest Everard Callan
Walter Ernest Everard Callan, son of Philip Callan MP also studied Law and attended Kings Inns in Dublin. He was called to the Bar in 1903. Walter was private secretary to the last Viceroy in Ireland and continued in the civil service, serving in Australia as Private Secretary to the Governor General. Papers to this effect can be obtained from the National Library of Australia and correspondence from and to Mr Walter Callan can be seen in Prime Minister Deakins' Papers which are also available from the National Museum of Australia. Walter Callan went on to become Senior Counsel at the Irish Bar and resided at Baggot Street, Dublin until his death.

Owen McDonnell Callan
Owen McDonnell Callan, son of Philip Callan MP, was sentenced to ten years in prison by the consular court in Gibraltar in 1898, for attempted murder. He was a member of a gang who tried to kill a wealthy young man, Hubert Birkin, after taking out a large life insurance policy. Callan, who was working as Birkin's secretary, accompanied him to Tangiers, where he tried to throw Birkin off a balcony before shooting him and beating him over the head.

Sources
Note Mr. P. Callan, M.P was convicted of libel against Mr. A.M. sullivan M.P. 30 Nov, 1880 (Magistrates List 1880)
National Museum of Australia, Papers of Prime Minister Deakin of Australia.
Kings Inns Admittance Papers of Philip Callan, 1865, Kings Inns Library.
Kings Inns Admittance Papers of Walter Ernest Everard Callan, 1903, Kings Inns Library.
Gerard Moran, "Philip Callan, A Nationalist MP", Article County Louth Archaeological Journal 1994. Available at Drogheda Civic Library.
F. Hugh O'Donnell, A History of the Irish Parliamentary Party Vol 1 & 2. (1910), Longmans, Green & Co.

References

External links 

1837 births
1902 deaths
Members of the Parliament of the United Kingdom for County Louth constituencies (1801–1922)
UK MPs 1868–1874
UK MPs 1874–1880
UK MPs 1880–1885
Irish Liberal Party MPs
Alumni of King's Inns